Kamil Jadach (born 23 May 1990) is a Polish footballer who plays as a midfielder or forward for GKS Jastrzębie.

Career

As a youth player, Jadach joined the youth academy of MOSiR Jastrzębie.

He started his career with GKS Jastrzębie, helping them achieve promotion from the Polish sixth division to the Polish second division within 7 seasons.

References

External links
 
 

Polish footballers
1990 births
Living people
I liga players
II liga players
III liga players
GKS Jastrzębie players
Association football forwards
Association football midfielders
People from Jastrzębie-Zdrój